Gloria FX was a Ukrainian-American visual effects company. The company was known for creating visual effects for feature films, music videos and commercials.
It was founded in 2008 by Tomash Kuzmytskyi and Sergii Mashevskyi, but by March 2020 the company had been dissolved.

The Gloria FX School was opened in 2013.

The company collaborates with major US and European production companies such as Partizan, Black Dog, London Alley Entertainment, Iconoclast, the Masses, Saatchi&Saatchi, BHC Films, Friendly Films AS, NE Derection, Ramble West Productions, Aggressive Group, Doomsday Entertainment, Star Media. Also worked with such directors as Colin Tilley, Ray Kay, Nabil, Chris Marrs Piliero.

Gloria FX has completed many successful effects projects for music artists, including Chris Brown, Lil Wayne, Wiz Khalifa, Rick Ross,
Kelly Clarkson, Nicki Minaj, Daft Punk, Tyga, Justin Bieber, Foals, Madcon, Cher, Ciara, Busta Rhymes, Hurts, Snoop Dogg and many others.

Awards

References

Special effects companies
3D computer graphics
Visual effects companies